Meredith College is a private women's liberal arts college and coeducational graduate school in Raleigh, North Carolina.  As of 2021 Meredith enrolls approximately 1,500 women in its undergraduate programs and 300 men and women in its graduate programs.

History

Chartered by the First Baptist Church the Baptist Female University opened in 1891 in a facility in downtown Raleigh. In 1904, the name was changed to Baptist University for Women.  The name "Meredith College" was chosen in 1909 to honor Thomas Meredith who was the founder of the Baptist newspaper The Biblical Recorder.

In 1997, the college moved away from a direct connection with the Baptist State Convention of North Carolina.

Meredith began construction at the current location on Hillsborough Street near North Carolina State University in 1924, and students began attending classes there in 1926.

In 1980 an angel was chosen as the school sports mascot, but in the summer of 2007 this was changed to the "Avenging Angels".

In April 2022, the school renamed Joyner Hall, named for white supremacy advocate James Yadkin Joyner, as part of Anti-Racism Initiatives.

Academics
38 majors are offered at Meredith, as well as licensure, graduate, and pre-professional programs.  According to U.S. News & World Report the most popular majors are Psychology, Biology/Biological Sciences, Business Administration and Management, Child Development and Social Work.

Upon completion of an undergraduate major, students can receive a Bachelor of Arts,  Bachelor of Science, Bachelor of Music, or Bachelor of Social Work. The John E. Weems Graduate School is coeducational.

Undergraduate students who wish to study engineering can participate in a five-year dual-degree program, whereby they can receive degrees from both Meredith and North Carolina State University's College of Engineering.  To do this, students must major in either chemistry, computer science or mathematics at Meredith.  Through this arrangement, students receive a B.A. from Meredith in chemistry, computer science or mathematics and a B.S. from NCSU in engineering.

The college's Undergraduate Research Program supports student/faculty partnerships for the purposes of academic research and creative activity in all fields. College funds support these projects and underwrite travel costs for students presenting their work at conferences.  The college hosts an annual one-day research conference in April to present work of Meredith students.

Student life

Meredith College is noted for its traditions, which range from the Honor Code to Cornhuskin', a yearly weeklong festival encouraging competition between graduating classes. Meredith College also celebrates its Founder's Day every year. During each college generation, faculty perform Alice in Wonderland for students, keeping their involvement in the production a secret up until the students see them on stage.

Rankings and classifications

As of 2021, Meredith College was ranked #136 in the category of Best Liberal Arts Colleges by U.S. News & World Report , was ranked #119 by Forbes among "In The South", and was categorized by The Princeton Review in the Best Southeastern category.

Meredith College was ranked fifth among regional colleges in the South in the 2016 edition of U.S. News & World Report's Best Colleges rankings.  Meredith College is not included in this ranking as a southern regional university.

Athletics
 Meredith athletes compete in basketball, cross country, field hockey, golf, lacrosse, soccer, softball, tennis, track and field and volleyball. In August 2014 Meredith College announced the addition of track and field and in September 2019 announced the addition of golf as well as field hockey.

A member of the USA South Athletic Conference since 2007, Meredith has claimed 26 USA South championships, made 15 NCAA appearances, and had 300 student-athletes named all-conference and 670 to USA South All-American.

Notable people (selection)

Administration
E. Bruce Heilman, president (1966–1971)
Thomas Meredith, founding figure and namesake
Leonidas L. Polk, founding figure
Hoyt Patrick Taylor, former trustee

Alumnae
 Carrie Lougee Broughton, North Carolina State Librarian
 Margaret Currin, first woman U.S. attorney in North Carolina, class of 1972
 Addie Elizabeth Davis, first woman ordained as a Southern Baptist pastor.
 Eleanor Layfield Davis, artist; class of 1932
 Annie Dove Denmark, first woman to be president of a college or university in South Carolina
 Susan Hill, women's rights advocate
 Eleanor Hines (known professionally as Margaret Arlen), talk show host
 Roxie Collie Laybourne, ornithologist
 Beth Leavel, Tony Award winning musical theatre actor
 Dale Mercer, interior designer, television personality, and socialite
 Sarah Parker, Former Chief Justice of the North Carolina Supreme Court
 Suzanne Reynolds, law professor and North Carolina Supreme Court candidate
 Silda Wall Spitzer, chair of Children for Children and former First Lady of New York
 Patricia N. Willoughby, former interim North Carolina Superintendent of Public Instruction
 Adrian H. Wood, educator, blogger, and writer
 Judy Woodruff, journalist
 Kendra Dillingham, author, award winning Welcome and Connections Coordinator at Holy Trinity Anglican Church, Socialite

Faculty
 Louise Hawes, writer and former guest lecturer
 Thomas C. Parramore, historian and noted North Carolina scholar
 Arthur Poister, organist
 Ida Isabella Poteat, painter
 Marion Elizabeth Stark, mathematician
 Lillian Frances Parker Wallace, historian

See also
Women's Colleges in the Southern United States
SS Meredith Victory - WWII era cargo freighter, named for Meredith College, and credited with the largest ever humanitarian rescue operation by a single ship during the Korean War.

References

External links

 
 Official athletics website
 Meredith College student yearbooks on DigitalNC.org

 
Women's universities and colleges in the United States
Universities and colleges in the Research Triangle
Educational institutions established in 1891
Universities and colleges in Raleigh, North Carolina
Liberal arts colleges in North Carolina
Universities and colleges accredited by the Southern Association of Colleges and Schools
Women in North Carolina
1891 establishments in North Carolina
Private universities and colleges in North Carolina